Emanuel Maximiliano Romero (born 23 March 1992) is an Argentine professional footballer who plays as a central midfielder for Andino.

Career
Romero began his career in Torneo Argentino B with Colegiales, scoring five goals in forty-seven matches between 2010 and 2012. A move to Adelante followed in 2013, which preceded a stint with El Linqueño. He rejoined Adelante for the 2015 campaign, before moving to Sportivo Rivadavia a year later which saw the midfielder feature three times. Romero moved up to Torneo Federal A with Unión Sunchales on 10 July 2016. Thirty appearances followed. August 2017 saw Romero join Central Córdoba. They were promoted in 2017–18, with Romero making his pro debut in Primera B Nacional versus Brown on 1 October 2018.

In February, Romero suffered a ruptured anterior cruciate ligament in his left knee, which required a long recovery. Once he got available again, he didn't get the chance to play. Romero spent 16 months without official matches and on June 30 2020, his contract expired and Romero left Central. In September 2020, Romero signed with Sacachispas. In 2021, he joined Atlético Paraná.

Career statistics
.

Honours
Central Córdoba
Torneo Federal A: 2017–18

References

External links

1992 births
Living people
Footballers from Buenos Aires
Argentine footballers
Association football midfielders
Torneo Argentino B players
Torneo Federal A players
Primera Nacional players
Club Atlético Adelante players
Club Atlético El Linqueño players
Unión de Sunchales footballers
Central Córdoba de Santiago del Estero footballers
Sacachispas Fútbol Club players
Club Atlético Paraná players